Isao Satō may refer to:

 Isao Sato (actor) (1949–1990), Japanese actor
 Isao Satō (astronomer) (born 1963), Japanese astronomer

See also 
 Asteroid 6338 Isaosato, named after the astronomer